The Michigan–Ohio State football rivalry, referred to as The Game by some followers, is an American college football rivalry game that is played annually between the Michigan Wolverines and the Ohio State Buckeyes. Michigan and Ohio State are two of the most successful teams in NCAA Division I football. The rivalry has gathered profound national interest as many of the games determined the Big Ten Conference title and the resulting Rose Bowl Game matchups, as well as the outcome of the NCAA Division I college football championship. In 2000, the game was ranked by ESPN as the greatest North American sports rivalry ever.

The teams first met in 1897, and the rivalry had been played annually and uninterrupted from 1918 until 2020, when it was not held due to the coronavirus pandemic. The game has been played at the end of the regular season since 1935 (except for 1942, 1986, 1998, and 2020). Since 1918, the game's site has alternated between Ann Arbor, Michigan (in odd-numbered years) and Columbus, Ohio (in even-numbered years), and has been played in Ohio Stadium since 1922 and Michigan Stadium since 1927. Through 2010, Ohio State and Michigan have decided the Big Ten Conference championship between themselves on 22 different occasions, and affected the determination of the conference title an additional 27 times.

For many years, the game aired on ABC, usually in the 12 p.m. Eastern time slot, and for many years, ESPN College GameDay has originated that weekend from the game site. Beginning with the 2017 season, the game airs on Fox as a result of that network acquiring the Big Ten's tier-1 rights in the most recent broadcasting contract, and GameDay competitor Big Noon Kickoff originates from the game site. In 2021 and 2022, ESPN and Fox's pre-game shows both originated at the same time from Ann Arbor and Columbus, respectively.

Series history

Early years (1897–1949)
When Michigan and Ohio State met for the first time in 1897, the Toledo War was within the memories of some still living, and the short-lived border war may have fueled the rivalry between the two opposing teams. The inaugural game, held at Ann Arbor, resulted in a lopsided victory for Michigan, with the Wolverines posting a 34–0 win over Ohio State's Buckeyes. The teams did not meet in 1898 or 1899, but played again in 1900.

The first game foretold a long Michigan winning streak, with Michigan winning or tying every game from 1897 to 1912 and thereby compiling a 12–0–2 record before the contest was postponed for several years. The Ohio State Alma Mater "Carmen Ohio" was written on the train ride home to Columbus following the 1902 contest, which saw Ohio State lose to Michigan 86–0. The lyrics and melody (Spanish Chant) have remained largely unchanged since its conception.

Ohio State became a member of the Big Ten in 1912. In 1917, Michigan rejoined the conference after a ten-year absence. In 1918, the teams played their first conference matchup, with Michigan prevailing 14–0 and lodging its eleventh shutout over the Buckeyes. The rivalry has been scheduled annually since then. In 1919, the Buckeyes (led by legendary halfback Chic Harley) won their first game in the series, beating the Wolverines 13–3. The Buckeyes won the following two contests as well, to bring the series record to 13–3–2.

Harley's prowess spurred the university to campaign to build a stadium for Ohio State football. The stadium was completed in 1922, and the first of many historic games in Ohio Stadium took place on October 21, 1922, the day the stadium was dedicated in Columbus. In front of a record 71,000 fans, the Wolverines posted another shutout of the home team Buckeyes, 19–0. According to lore, there was a wager on the outcome of this game, and yellow flowers on a blue background still exist today in the upper part of the stadium's rotunda. Michigan won the next five games before OSU picked up the final two victories of the decade. At the end of the 1920s, the series stood at 19–5–2 in favor of Michigan.

Michigan won three of four contests between 1930 and 1933, claiming the national championship twice. In 1934, Francis Schmidt came on as the head coach for Ohio State. The team had lost nine of the previous 12 Michigan-OSU contests, and when a reporter asked Schmidt if Ohio State could beat Michigan that year, he replied, "Of course we can win, Michigan puts their pants on one leg at a time just like we do". The Buckeyes thereupon ran off four straight shutout victories against Michigan, outscoring the Wolverines 114–0 from 1934 to 1937. Schmidt's quote spawned an OSU tradition—since 1934, every Ohio State player receives a gold pants pendant after a victory against Michigan.

Michigan won the three games from 1938 to 1940. The 1940 game, won by Michigan, 40–0, was the benchmark performance of what some consider to be the greatest Michigan team in history, and was the final collegiate game of the tailback tandem of Tom Harmon and Paul Kromer.

In 1941, Michigan and Ohio State met for the first time with each team ranked in the AP Poll, which had started in 1936. The 14th-ranked Buckeyes played the 5th-ranked Wolverines to a 20–20 tie in Ann Arbor.

In 1945, Michigan quarterback Howard Yerges led Michigan to a 7–3 victory over Ohio State. Yerges played for Ohio State in 1943 as a freshman (freshmen were eligible to play during wartime) and then transferred to Michigan in 1944, making him one of three players to play on both sides in the rivalry. Five more times during the 1940s, the teams were both ranked for their annual matchup. Michigan won five of the next seven games before playing to their second tie of the decade in 1949. The series record stood at 30–12–4 at the mid-century mark.

"Snow Bowl" and Woody Hayes (1950–1968)

One of the more famous games in the rivalry is the 1950 contest, colloquially known as the Snow Bowl. Eighth-ranked Ohio State, coached by Wes Fesler, was scheduled to host the game on November 25 in Columbus amidst one of the worst blizzards on Ohio record. The Buckeyes, who led the Big Ten, were granted the option to cancel the game against Michigan, which would have, by default, given the Buckeyes the Big Ten title outright. Ohio State refused, and the game was set to be played. Amid howling snow and wind, in a famous example of a "field position" game, the teams exchanged 45 punts, often on first down, in hopes that the other team would fumble the ball near or into their own end zone. Ohio State's Vic Janowicz, who would claim the Heisman Trophy that year, punted 21 times for 685 yards and also kicked a field goal in the first quarter for the Buckeyes' only points. Michigan capitalized on two blocked punts, booting one out of the back of the end zone for a safety and recovering another one in the end zone for a touchdown just before halftime. Despite failing to gain a single first down or complete a single forward pass, Michigan gained a 9–3 victory, securing the Big Ten title and a Rose Bowl berth. Heavy criticism of Fesler's play calling led to his resignation and the hiring of Woody Hayes as his successor.

Between 1951 and 1968 under Hayes, the Buckeyes won 12 of 18 contests, including a 1957 victory in Michigan Stadium, the first game in the series attended by over 100,000 fans. In 1958, Ohio State had a 20–14 lead towards the end of the game. On the final play, Michigan fullback Gene Sisinyak ran the ball from the one-yard line for what might have been a game-winning touchdown, but Ohio State defensive tackle Dick Schafrath hit Sisinyak, forcing a fumble. In the 1968 game, Ohio State won 50–14, outscoring its foe 29–0 in the second half and attempting an unsuccessful two-point conversion attempt on its final touchdown. In the post-game interview Hayes was asked why he went for two points with an already insurmountable 50–14 lead and he replied, "because they wouldn't let me go for three". The victory gave top-ranked Ohio State the Big Ten title for the first time in seven years en route to an AP national championship. The Buckeyes had also narrowed the series margin to 37–24–4.

"Ten-Year War": Hayes vs Schembechler (1969–1978)

Wolverines coach Bump Elliott resigned after the 1968 loss and Michigan hired Miami (Ohio) head coach Bo Schembechler, who had previously been an assistant at Ohio State under Hayes, to revitalize its football program. On November 22, 1969, Hayes led his top-ranked Buckeyes into Michigan Stadium to face Schembechler's Wolverines in the first matchup between two coaches who would come to define the rivalry between the two programs. The Buckeyes brought a 22-game winning streak into Ann Arbor, but behind an inspiring 60-yard punt return by Barry Pierson that set up a Wolverine touchdown in the second quarter, and a defense that intercepted Ohio State six times (three by Pierson), the Wolverines won a defensive battle (both teams were scoreless in the second half) for a 24–12 upset.

The contest was the first in the famous "Ten-Year War" between Hayes and Schembechler, which pitted some of OSU's and UM's strongest teams against one another. Four times between 1970 and 1975, Ohio State and Michigan were both ranked in the top five of the AP Poll before their matchup. The Wolverines entered every game during those years undefeated and won only once, a 10–7 victory in Ann Arbor on November 20, 1971. The Michigan graduating class of 1975 shared or won the Big Ten championship every season, yet went to the Rose Bowl only once, in 1972. They only lost or tied with Ohio State during the regular season in that period.

In 1973, both teams entered undefeated, with the winner guaranteed a trip to the Rose Bowl. The rivals played to a 10–10 tie in Ann Arbor on November 24, and the athletic directors of the other Big Ten institutions were forced to vote on the Big Ten representative for the bowl game. In a secret ballot, Ohio State won the vote, to the outrage of Michigan athletic officials and fans. Schembechler argued that Michigan was robbed of its on-field achievements, and for months afterward, Ohio State newspapers were flooded with angry Wolverine letters and threats of lawsuits.

Woody coined the phrase "That state up north" and "That team up north", so he would not have to say the word "Michigan". He was famous for his intense hatred of all things Michigan and according to legend, once refused to get gas in an empty tank, saying: "No, goddammit! We do NOT pull in and fill up. And I'll tell you exactly why we don't. It's because I don't buy one goddam drop of gas in the state of Michigan! We'll coast and PUSH this goddam car to the Ohio line before I give this state a nickel of my money!"

During the "Ten-Year War," Ohio State and Michigan shared the Big Ten title six times. Between 1976 and 1978, Michigan won the game each year, and Ohio State failed to score a touchdown in each of those contests.

The Schembechler-Hayes "War" ended in 1978 after Hayes was fired as a result of punching Clemson linebacker Charlie Bauman on December 29, 1978, during the Gator Bowl. The 1978 OSU-UM game was won by Michigan, 14–3, giving Schembechler a record of 5–4–1 against Hayes. At the end of Hayes' tenure, the series stood at 42–28–5.

Schembechler vs Bruce (1979–1987)
Earle Bruce took over for Hayes and led the Buckeyes to a 5–4 record against Schembechler's Wolverines between 1979 and 1987, perhaps the most balanced stretch of the rivalry, during which neither team won more than two consecutive games. In 1987, Bruce was fired in the week before the Michigan game due to a poor season record, but was allowed to coach anyway, and the inspired Buckeyes (each wearing a sweatband labeled "Earle") won an upset over the heavily favored Wolverines. After the game, Bo Schembechler told Bruce, "I always mind losing to Ohio State but I didn't mind so much today." After 1987, the series stood at 46–33–5 in favor of UM.

John Cooper era (1988–2000)
The 13 games during John Cooper's tenure as Buckeye coach were dominated by Michigan, as the Wolverines went 10–2–1 during the stretch. Schembechler coached Michigan through the 1989 season and then turned over the reins to one of his assistants, Gary Moeller, who led the team for five seasons before another longtime Michigan assistant, Lloyd Carr, became the head coach in 1995.

The most notorious matchups of the era took place in 1993, 1995, and 1996, in which Ohio State entered the game each year undefeated. The Buckeyes had a 9–0–1 record heading into the 1993 game and were looking to claim an outright Big Ten title against a Michigan team that had already lost four times. Michigan receiver Mercury Hayes and running backs Jon Ritchie, Che Foster, and Ed Davis each scored a touchdown as the Wolverines shocked the Buckeyes, 28–0. After the game, Cooper said: "This is one of the most embarrassing games I've ever been involved with." "They outplayed us on offense, on defense, and in the kicking game. If you'd told me we would come up here and get beat 28–0, I'd have probably stayed home."

In 1995, #2 Ohio State was led by eventual Heisman Trophy winner Eddie George and future National Football League (NFL) stars Orlando Pace, Terry Glenn, Mike Vrabel, Shawn Springs, and Rickey Dudley. Glenn insisted there wasn't anything special about the Wolverines: "Michigan's nothing," he said. Perhaps inspired by this remark, the Wolverines manhandled the Buckeyes at the line of scrimmage from the very first play. Michigan senior running back Tim Biakabutuka amassed 313 yards rushing in Michigan's 31–23 upset.

The Buckeyes had high expectations again entering the 1996 contest. They boasted an unblemished 10–0 record and were ranked No. 2 in the nation as they entered the finale with 7–3 Michigan. When Ohio State jumped to a 9–0 halftime lead, the OSU crowd sensed a special finish and perhaps a rise to No. 1. The Wolverines' defense shut the Buckeyes out in the second half while Brian Griese replaced the struggling Scott Dreisbach and led Michigan to 13 unanswered points and another victory over their rivals, 13–9. The game would turn out to be the Buckeyes' only loss of the season and ended up costing them a chance at the national championship.

In 1997, Ohio State hoped to return the favor: the 10–0 Wolverines sat atop the AP Poll entering their matchup with the 10–1 Buckeyes, who were ranked No. 4. Spearheaded by the play of eventual Heisman winner Charles Woodson, who ran a punt back for a touchdown, intercepted a pass in the Ohio State end zone, and caught a 37-yard pass that set up freshman running back Anthony Thomas' touchdown run, the Wolverines prevailed, 20–14. The Wolverines then defeated Washington State in the Rose Bowl by a 21–16 score, winning their only national championship since 1948.

Ohio State came back with a win in the 1998 contest, but Michigan went on to win in 1999 and 2000. Senior quarterback Tom Brady hit sophomore receiver Marquise Walker for the game-winning touchdown pass with five minutes to go to for a 24–17 victory in 1999. In the 2000 game, Michigan grabbed a 31–12 lead and held on to win, 38–26. Michigan junior quarterback Drew Henson went 14 for 25 passing for 303 yards and three scores and added a touchdown run. At the end of the 2000 season, Cooper was fired. While he consistently fielded strong teams, his 2–10–1 record against Michigan, including his failure to ever win in Ann Arbor, was, along with disciplinary problems and a losing record in bowl games, a major contributor to his dismissal. Michigan students held a "John Cooper Day" mock celebration in Ann Arbor on February 10, 2001, as that date in Month-Day-Year format corresponded with Cooper's record in the rivalry.

Enter Jim Tressel (2001–2006)

In 2001, Youngstown State head football coach Jim Tressel took over as Buckeye head coach. Unlike his predecessor John Cooper, Tressel put a special emphasis on the rivalry. In his introductory speech at halftime of a January basketball game, against Michigan, he said "I can assure you that you will be proud of our young people, in the classroom, in the community, and most especially in 310 days in Ann Arbor, Michigan on the football field." In his first year, Tressel registered the Buckeyes' first defeat of the Wolverines in Ann Arbor in 14 years, by a 26–20 score. Led by senior running back Jonathan Wells, the Buckeyes raced to a 23–0 halftime lead. With Wells out, Michigan mounted a second half comeback that fell just short. The next year, Tressel achieved what Cooper could not: Beating Michigan in consecutive years with a 14–9 victory. The game was decided on the last play when defensive back Will Allen intercepted a pass at the two yard line as time expired to clinch the victory. The Buckeyes were led by freshman running back Maurice Clarett, who ran for 119 yards and one touchdown. He also had a key reception to set up Maurice Hall's game-winning score. The Buckeyes went on to win the national championship that season, as they defeated Miami in the Fiesta Bowl.

In 2003, Michigan struck back and won the 100th meeting between the historical rivals by a score of 35–21 in Ann Arbor. Senior running back Chris Perry, a Heisman finalist, had 154 yards rushing and two touchdowns to lead the Wolverines to the victory. Braylon Edwards contributed seven catches for 130 yards and two big touchdowns. The game's attendance was 112,118, the largest crowd ever for an NCAA football game at the time. In 2004, the 6–4 Buckeyes defeated the heavily favored 9–1 Wolverines, 37–21, behind the leadership of quarterback Troy Smith and true freshman receiver Ted Ginn Jr. The Buckeyes added another win in the 2005 game by overcoming a 21–12 deficit with less than eight minutes in the game. In the closing minutes of the game, the Buckeye offense scored two touchdowns to claim a 25–21 victory. Smith threw for 300 yards and completed 73% of his passes. Ginn had a game high nine catches for 89 yards.

2006: No. 1 vs. No. 2

On November 18, 2006, Ohio State and Michigan met for their annual showdown, each carrying an 11–0 record. For the first time in the history of the rivalry, the two rivals faced off while holding the top two spots in the Bowl Championship Series rankings. Ohio State won the game by a score of 42–39 and became the outright Big Ten champion, earning the right to play for a national championship at the BCS National Championship Game in Glendale, Arizona. Michigan struck first with a touchdown run by junior running back Mike Hart, but the Buckeyes then scored 21 unanswered points, and at halftime, they were up 28–14. Thanks to an interception and a fumble recovery by junior defensive tackle Alan Branch, Michigan made it 35–31 Ohio State with 14 minutes to go in the fourth quarter. But after appearing to have forced Ohio State into a fourth-down situation with six minutes to go, junior outside linebacker Shawn Crable was called for roughing the passer, giving the Buckeyes a fresh set of downs. Ohio State quarterback Troy Smith then passed to Brian Robiskie for a touchdown, increasing the Buckeyes' lead to 42–31 with five minutes remaining in the game. After Ohio State was called for pass interference on a failed fourth-down attempt, giving Michigan an automatic first down, junior quarterback Chad Henne found senior tight end Tyler Ecker for a 16-yard touchdown with two minutes to go to cut the OSU lead to 42–37. Senior wide receiver Steve Breaston caught the two-point conversion to bring the Wolverines within a field goal. Michigan needed to recover the ensuing onside kick, but they failed to do so. The Buckeyes ran out the clock for the victory, and a trip to the BCS national championship game. Troy Smith completed 71% of his passes for 316 yards and four touchdowns, essentially clinching the Heisman trophy. Ginn caught eight passes for 104 yards and a touchdown. Ohio State running back Antonio Pittman ran for 139 yards on 18 carries for a 7.7 yards-per-carry average. Michigan running back Mike Hart carried the ball 23 times for 142 yards and three touchdowns against a stout Buckeye defense. Chad Henne had 267 yards, two touchdowns, and no turnovers on a 60% completion percentage. Neither performance was, however, sufficient to turn the tide in favor of the Wolverines. The game was highly touted by ESPN/ABC (there was a game countdown clock for a week before kickoff) and was viewed by the largest television audience for a regular-season college football game since 1993, averaging 21.8 million viewers. The victory marked the first time in 43 years that the Buckeyes had won three consecutive games in the series. The game gained even more significance when, on the eve of the meeting, Michigan head coach and former Ohio State assistant coach Bo Schembechler died. Schembechler was honored with a video tribute at Ohio Stadium as well as a moment of silence before kickoff.
Half an hour after the game ended, the Ohio Lottery PICK 4 evening drawing was 4–2–3–9, matching the final score of the game and paying out up to $5,000 per winner, for a total payout of $2.2 million.

Following the game, there was a chance of a rematch in the 2007 BCS National Championship Game, but Florida was chosen over Michigan to be Ohio State's opponent, which Florida won 41–14.

A carousel of coaches (2007–2014)

Lloyd Carr retired as coach at Michigan following the 2007 season, which included a 14-3 loss to Ohio State. Tressel had compiled a 6–1 record against Carr's Michigan teams, leaving Carr with a 6–7 career record against the Buckeyes. In December 2007, Michigan hired West Virginia head coach Rich Rodriguez to take over the football program. Rodriguez, known for his expertise in the spread offense, represented a significant departure from the Wolverines' traditional power running style. Furthermore, both Carr and his predecessor Gary Moeller had been apprenticed by the now-legendary Schembechler, and Rodriguez's hiring marked the first time in 40 years that a Michigan football team would not be coached by a member of the "Woody Hayes coaching tree".

The 2008 game, Rodriguez's first against the Buckeyes, featured an Ohio State team that needed a win to secure at least a share of the Big Ten championship for the fourth straight year. Michigan by contrast entered the game with a 3–8 record, having already suffered more losses than in any other season in its history. The Buckeyes posted a 42–7 win, and scored their largest margin of victory over Michigan since 1968.

Ohio State won 21–10 in the 2009 game to extend their winning streak against Michigan to six games, their longest in the rivalry's history, and improve Jim Tressel's record versus Michigan to 8–1. Ohio State wore throwback uniforms to commemorate their 1954 national championship team. The 2009 meeting also saw Buckeye guard Justin Boren, who had transferred to Ohio State from Michigan in 2008, become the third player in school history to play for both teams (J. T. White and Howard Yerges, Jr. being the others) and only the second to play for both teams in the rivalry game. In 2010, Ohio State again prevailed, 37–7 but had to vacate all wins from the 2010 season.

Rodriguez was fired following Michigan's 2010 season, ending Michigan's flirtation with the spread—and with non-"Michigan Man" coaches. Rodriguez was succeeded by Brady Hoke, who served as Michigan's defensive line coach from 1995 to 2002. Hoke held head coaching positions at Ball State from 2003 to 2008 and San Diego State from 2009 to 2010 before returning to Michigan. Meanwhile, in Columbus, the Ohio State football program came under NCAA investigation in early 2011 for an incident in which several prominent players were discovered to have traded memorabilia for tattoos. Evidence surfaced that Tressel had known about the situation but had not reported it to school compliance officials, and that the abuses were more widespread and longstanding than originally reported. On May 30, 2011, Tressel resigned as head coach and former Buckeye player and assistant coach Luke Fickell was appointed interim head coach for the 2011 season. In July 2011, in response to the ongoing NCAA investigation, Ohio State vacated all wins from the 2010 season, including the win over Michigan, leaving Tressel with a final record against Michigan of 8–1, with a win streak of six.

Michigan won the 2011 meeting, 40–34, which was the first between two first-year coaches since the 1929 match-up of Harry Kipke and Sam Willaman. The Wolverines were led by junior quarterback Denard Robinson who accounted for 337 total yards rushing and passing, and five touchdowns.

On November 28, 2011, Urban Meyer, who had served as a graduate assistant at Ohio State from 1986 to 1987, was named the 24th head coach for the Buckeyes, replacing Fickell. In the 2012 matchup, OSU's junior running back Carlos Hyde ran for 146 yards and the fourth-ranked Buckeyes, trailing at halftime, shut down No. 20 Michigan's offense in the second half to prevail 26–21 and cap a 12–0 season.

In 2013, Ohio State came to Michigan Stadium with an 11–0 record (7–0 Big Ten) and ranked No. 3 in the BCS standings. Michigan was a disappointing 7–4 (3–4 Big Ten). In spite of the seeming mismatch, the game remained close and with 32 seconds remaining Michigan scored to bring the score to 42–41. Michigan attempted a two-point conversion for the lead, but Devin Gardner's pass was intercepted in the end zone by Tyvis Powell, and Ohio State escaped with the win. The Wolverines lost despite piling up 603 yards of offense, including 451 passing yards from Devin Gardner. The game is also notable for a fight that broke out on the field during the second quarter, in which punches were thrown and both benches cleared. One Michigan player (Royce-Jenkins Stone), and two Ohio State players (Dontre Wilson and Marcus Hall), were all ejected from the game for fighting. As Hall was escorted to the locker room, he double flipped the crowd on his way out, drawing ire in the process.

Michigan entered the 2014 contest with a 5–6 record and needed a win against Ohio State to become bowl eligible. Ohio State had a 10–1 record (7–0 in the Big Ten), and was holding onto hope that they would be selected as one of the top four teams in the nation and gain a spot in the first ever College Football Playoff. The game was tied at 21 until the fourth quarter when Ohio State scored three touchdowns (two on offense and one on defense) to go up 42–21. The game ended 42–28. During the contest, OSU quarterback J. T. Barrett suffered a broken ankle and left the game in favor of third-string sophomore quarterback, Cardale Jones. Ohio State would go on to win the inaugural College Football Playoff and national championship.

Three days after the game, Michigan head coach Brady Hoke was fired and Michigan began searching for Hoke's successor. On December 30, 2014, Jim Harbaugh, former quarterback for Michigan from 1983 to 1986, was introduced by the University of Michigan as the school's new head football coach.

Harbaugh vs Meyer (2015–2018)

The 2015 game in Ann Arbor marked Harbaugh's first game as a head coach in the rivalry. His Michigan team was 9–2 coming into the game and Ohio State was 10–1. For the first time since 2006, both teams were ranked in the top 10, with Ohio State at No. 8 and Michigan at No. 10. The first half was close, with Michigan scoring a touchdown shortly before halftime to narrow Ohio State's lead to 14–10. Ohio State, however, scored touchdowns on each of its first four possessions in the second half, while Michigan could only muster a single field goal. The final score was 42–13, in favor of Ohio State.

The 2016 game pitted the third-ranked Wolverines against the second-ranked Buckeyes, only the second time that the matchup featured programs both ranked in the nation's top three. Michigan led 10–7 at halftime and extended its lead to 17–7 early in the third quarter. An Ohio State touchdown cut the deficit to 17–14 heading to the fourth quarter. The Buckeyes kicked a field goal in the final seconds of regulation to tie the game and force overtime. The game marked the first overtime in the series between the two teams. Ohio State defeated Michigan for the fifth consecutive time, winning 30–27 in two overtimes. However, significant controversy emerged over a critical fourth down spot in double overtime. Ohio State quarterback J.T. Barrett kept the ball on a 4th and 1 play. He was tackled almost exactly on the line to gain, and the ensuing spot gave Barrett a first down. Had he not been given the first down, the game would have ended and Michigan would have won. Whether or not Barrett reached the line is a heavily contested question, and one that remains a point of contention between fans of both teams to this day.

The 2017 game, held in Ann Arbor, drew a crowd of more than 112,000, and featured the ninth-ranked Buckeyes against the unranked Wolverines. Michigan led 14–0 at the end of the first quarter but Ohio State tied the game at 14–14 before halftime. Michigan's offense was limited to six points in the second half, and Ohio State scored 17, winning the game 31–20. The victory was the Buckeyes' sixth win in six years under head coach Urban Meyer. J.T. Barrett, Ohio State's starting quarterback, recorded 4 wins in 4 years as a starting quarterback—the first Ohio State QB to do so. Until this game, Ohio State had never come back and won a game against Michigan once down 14 or more points.

In 2018, the #4 Wolverines visited the #10 Buckeyes in a game with both Big Ten Championship and College Football Playoff implications. At a pre-game press conference, Michigan's running back Karan Higdon guaranteed a victory over Ohio State. Michigan entered the game with the best statistical defense in the country, but Ohio State gained more than 560 yards - including 6 touchdown passes - en route to a dominant 62–39 victory.  Ohio State's 62 points set a record for points against Michigan during regulation, and the victory improved Meyer's Ohio State teams' record against Michigan to 7–0.  Harbaugh fell to 0–4 against Ohio State, making him the first Michigan coach to lose his first four starts against the Buckeyes.  The 2018 meeting would be Meyer's last against Michigan, as he announced his retirement at the end of the season.

Harbaugh vs Day (2019–present)
The 2019 game matched #1 Ohio State at #13 Michigan. This was the Buckeyes' first full season under new head coach Ryan Day, who took over the program following the retirement of Meyer. Day previously served as the offensive coordinator under Meyer.  Undefeated Ohio State came into the game favored by nine and aimed to win their eighth straight game in the series, the longest in Ohio State's history and the second longest in the series. Behind over 300 passing yards from Justin Fields and 200 yards rushing from J. K. Dobbins, and 4 touchdowns from each player, Ohio State cruised to a 56–27 victory. Following the loss, Harbaugh faced tough questions from the press after he became the first coach to go 0–5 in the series, and second after the Buckeyes' John Cooper (0–4–1) to go winless in his first five games. When asked about the gap between the two schools, his reply was described as testy by multiple sources: "I'll answer your questions, not your insults."

On December 8, 2020, Michigan canceled the game against Ohio State, citing "an increasing number of positive COVID-19 cases and student-athletes in quarantine over the past week". It was the first time the game had not been played since 1917.

The 2021 game between #2 Ohio State and #5 Michigan in Ann Arbor was the twelfth time in the rivalry's history that both teams were ranked in the top five. Ohio State was initially favored by about 8 points, but Michigan won the game 42–27. Senior running back Hassan Haskins scored five touchdowns in the game, which is a record for any running back in the rivalry's history and tied for most in a single game in school history. Senior defensive end Aidan Hutchinson had 3 sacks, giving him a school record of 13 sacks on the season and propelling him into the Heisman race. The result ended Michigan's 8-game losing streak against Ohio State and gave coach Jim Harbaugh his first win against Ohio State in six tries. The game led Michigan to clinch their first ever visit to the Big Ten Championship Game, in which they won the Big Ten Conference for the first time since 2004, and their first outright conference championship since 2003.

In 2022, both #3 Michigan and #2 Ohio State entered the game undefeated for the first time since 2006. In the thirteenth top-five ranked matchup of The Game, Michigan won 45–23. The result was Michigan's first win in Ohio Stadium since 2000 and their first time winning consecutive games in the series since 1999-2000. Michigan outscored Ohio State 28–3 in the second half, with 530 yards of offense on the day, and five scoring plays of 45 yards or more. The Wolverines' 45 points were the most a Michigan team scored against Ohio State since 1946.

Big Ten expansion

In 2010, the Big Ten Conference announced that the University of Nebraska would be joining the Big Ten the following year, and that the Big Ten would be split into two divisions. When rumors surfaced that Ohio State and Michigan would be placed in different divisions, concerns arose that the teams might no longer play the last game of the regular season to avoid potential back-to-back games if each team won their division and earned the right to play in the Big Ten Championship Game. Fans bombarded the athletic directors of both schools, as well as the Big Ten commissioner with emails, creating pressure to keep The Game as the regular-season finale. Ultimately, Michigan was placed in the Legends Division and Ohio State in the Leaders Division. The Michigan–Ohio State game became a "protected crossover" game, to be played every year at the end of the regular season.

The game became a divisional matchup under the Big Ten's geographical realignment in 2014, with Michigan and Ohio State both placed in the East Division.

In popular culture
During the mid-2000s, ESPN aired several commercials describing certain situations that would be "normal, if it wasn't for sports". One commercial featured a man in an Ohio State shirt making out with a woman wearing a Michigan shirt. An ESPNU commercial air portrayed a couple on a blind date that appears to be successful until it becomes clear that she is from Michigan and he is a fan of Ohio State.

In 2006, as part of their "Midwest Midterm Midtacular", The Daily Show visited Ohio State University and made fun of the rivalry on the final night by having correspondent Rob Riggle report while wearing a Michigan sweatshirt. This brought boos, jeers, and a few laughs from the Ohio State audience. After the sketch was over, Jon Stewart compared the rivalry to the disputes between Sunni and Shiite Muslims.

The 2007 HBO documentary Michigan vs. Ohio State: The Rivalry focused on the rivalry, chiefly the "Ten-Year War" to the present, as of 2007.

The book Myth Directions by Robert Asprin, who attended Michigan, features a thinly veiled version of the Ohio State vs. Michigan game, parodying both sides and their fanaticism regarding the event.

The 1942 movie The Male Animal, based on a play of the same name by Ohio State alumni James Thurber and Elliott Nugent, also features a version of the game.

In 2011, 10-year-old Grant Reed of Columbus was diagnosed with a malignant brain tumor. Not liking to use the word "cancer", Reed (whose parents are both Ohio State alums and was himself an Ohio State fan) decided to call his cancer "Michigan", since "Ohio State is always going to beat Michigan". The move of calling his cancer "Michigan" got the support of his parents, Ohio State head coach Urban Meyer (who Reed later got to meet), and even some Michigan fans, including Michigan head coach Brady Hoke. After his last chemotherapy treatment in 2013 which placed him in remission, Reed told people that he "beat Michigan". When Reed died on February 10, 2019, his father posted on Facebook that "Grant won his final victory over 'M*CH*G*N' because it can never hurt him again."

The rivalry is featured in the RIVALS documentary series produced by Sinclair Broadcasting Group.

Accomplishments by the two rivals

As of November 2022, Michigan is number one, and Ohio State is number two on the  list of the college football teams with the most total wins in the history of college football; and Ohio State is number one and Michigan is number three on the list of college football teams with the highest winning percentage in the history of college football.

Game results
Rankings prior to 2014 are from the AP Poll. Rankings post-2014 are from the CFP poll.

Top-5 games 
Since the AP Poll began continuously being released in 1936, the Buckeyes and Wolverines have met 13 times in which both teams were ranked in the top 5 when they played. The first instance came in 1942, with the most recent in 2022. Rankings prior to 2014 are based on the AP poll. Beginning in 2014, rankings are based on the CFP Poll.

Ohio State holds a 7–5–1 record in these top-5 meetings.

Big Ten games
In Big Ten Conference play, Ohio State leads the series 51–48–4 through the 2022 meeting. Michigan was a charter member of the Big Ten in 1896 before leaving the league after the 1906 football season. Ohio State began league play with the 1913 season, and Michigan returned for the 1917 season. The 1918 matchup between the two schools was the first between them with both as Big Ten members. The 2020 game was canceled due to a COVID-19 outbreak at Michigan.

Notes

See also
 List of NCAA college football rivalry games
 List of most-played college football series in NCAA Division I

References

External links
 OSU vs UM — a history of the rivalry sponsored by the libraries of both universities

 
rivalry
Big Ten Conference rivalries
College football rivalries in the United States